Trelawney (or Trelawny) was launched in 1783 in Liverpool as a West Indiaman. In 1800 a French privateer captured her as Trelawney was sailing to the Mediterranean, but the Royal Navy quickly recaptured her. The ship traded with North America until she was wrecked on 19 February 1803.

Career
Trelawney was reported to have been originally intended to be a 36-gun frigate. She first appeared in Lloyd's Register (LR) in 1784.

In July 1788 Trelawney, Harrison, master, arrived at Liverpool from Jamaica. She brought with her the crew of Morant, Aikin master. Morant had been wrecked on the Key of the Cockscombs while sailing from Jamaica to Bristol.

On 19 October 1790 Captain Henry Bunster replaced Captain Thomas Harrison as master of Trelawney, however the change did not appear in Lloyd's Register. Then on 15 November 1791 Captain John Gillis replaced Captain Bunster.

On 22 October 1793, Captain Robert Cummins replaced Gillis. War with France had broken out in early 1793 and on 17 October Cummins acquired a letter of marque. 

In 1796 Trelawney was sold to residents of Glasgow.

Captain John Lockhard acquired a letter of marque on 7 January 1800.

On 14 February 1800  and  recaptured Trelawney, which had been sailing from Liverpool to Leghorn when the French Saint Malo privateer Bougainville captured her. Amazon also captured Bougainville, of eighteen 6-pounder guns and eighty-two men. The next day Bougainville ran into Amazon, lost her masts and foundered, but all but one man of her crew were saved. Amazon, including Bougainvilles crew, Endymion, and Trelawney arrived at Portsmouth on 21 February.

On 5 February 1801 Captain Isaac Duck acquired a letter of marque. On 28 December 1801 he returned to Liverpool from Virginia. His tenure as master of Trelawney did not appear in Lloyd's Register.

Fate
On 19 February 1803 Trelawney, Affleck, master, was returning to Liverpool from Baltimore. She took on board a pilot off Liverpool. Shortly thereafter she grounded on the Mad-Wharf sandbank, was refloated, but found to be so leaky that she was run onshore near Ravenglass, about 16 miles from Whitehaven, with 15 feet of water in her hold. The passengers were put ashore, but five lives were lost when a boat returning to the ship capsized. It was later reported that, despite hopes of salvage, she went to pieces on 25 February.

Notes

Citations

References
 
 

1783 ships
Age of Sail merchant ships of England
Captured ships
Maritime incidents in 1803